The Texas State Bobcats softball team represents Texas State University in NCAA Division I college softball.  The team participates in the Sun Belt Conference. The Bobcats are currently led by twenty-second-year head coach Ricci Woodard. The team plays its home games at Bobcat Softball Stadium located on the university's campus.

Year-by-year results

References:

References

 
Sun Belt Conference softball